Juana de Dios Castrello, better known as Diosa Costello (April 23, 1913 – June 20, 2013), was a Puerto Rican entertainer, performer, producer and club owner, often referred to as "the Latin Bombshell".

Early life
Costello was born Juana de Dios Castrello y Cruz in Guayama, Puerto Rico on April 23, 1913, although 1917 is often incorrectly sourced.

Career
After performing for some time at various venues in Spanish Harlem, she paired with Desi Arnaz at the La Conga club. Costello debuted on Broadway in Too Many Girls (1939), which was directed by George Abbott. Costello became the first Latina on the Broadway stage. Too Many Girls was chosen to be made into a film, however, Costello decided not to go with the film because she "never liked traveling much" and stayed in New York.

The Smithsonian filmed an interview with Costello in 2006. She died in her sleep on June 20, 2013 at the age of 100 in Hollywood, Florida.

Personal
She was married to Pupi Campo and Italian singer Don Casino.

Filmography

References

External links
 

1913 births
2013 deaths
American centenarians
American stage actresses
Puerto Rican centenarians
Puerto Rican stage actresses
People from Guayama, Puerto Rico
Women centenarians